Heron Bay is an unincorporated community on Mon Louis Island, in Mobile County, Alabama, United States.

Geography

References

Unincorporated communities in Alabama
Unincorporated communities in Mobile County, Alabama
Populated coastal places in Alabama